At the 1998 World Youth Games the athletics competition was held from 14–17 July at Luzhniki Stadium in Moscow, Russia. A total of 678 youth (under-18) athletes from 87 countries took part in the track and field events.

Several major countries with strong traditions in athletics were absent from the contests (among them Australia, Britain, Canada, France, Germany and the United States) and this undermined the overall quality of performances. Planned subsequent editions were not held. Although the games were not an initial success, the idea was revived in 2010 and athletics events were again held as part of the 2010 Summer Youth Olympics, which garnered wide participation.

Medal summary

Boys

Girls

See also
1998 World Junior Championships in Athletics

References

Results
World Youth Games 1998. World Junior Athletics History. Retrieved on 2013-10-20.

Athletics
World Youth Games
1998 World Youth Games
1998 World Youth Games
1998 World Youth Games